Sardarah (also Romanized as Sar Darreh) is a village in Takht Rural District, Takht District, Bandar Abbas County, Hormozgan Province, Iran. At the 2006 census, its population was 164, in 56 families.

References 

Populated places in Bandar Abbas County